James Stevenson Blackwood, 2nd Baron Dufferin and Claneboye  (8 July 1755 – 8 August 1836), styled as Sir James Blackwood, 3rd Baronet, from 1799 to 1807, was an Anglo-Irish peer and politician.

Early life and family
Blackwood was born in 1755, the second son of Sir John Blackwood, 2nd Baronet and Dorcas Stevenson, daughter and co-heiress of James Stevenson. His mother was quite wealthy as her father eventually became the sole heir to estates held by James Hamilton, 1st Earl of Clanbrassil, whose male line had died out with his son. In 1799, James' father died, leaving him to inherit the baronetcy as his elder brother, Robert Blackwood, had been killed in 1785 in a fall from his horse. Although commonly referred to as Anglo-Irish, the Blackwoods are a Scottish family.

In 1800, his mother was created Baroness Dufferin and Claneboye of Ballyleidy and Killyeagh in the Peerage of Ireland, with remainder to her heirs male. After her death in 1807, he succeeded her as the 2nd Baron Dufferin and Claneboye.

Career

Blackwood was a Member of the Parliament of Ireland for Killyleagh in County Down from 1788 until the Irish Parliament was abolished with the Act of Union in 1801. In compensation for his seat being disenfranchised, he received £15,000 from the crown.

He was later elected to the British House of Commons, serving as Member of Parliament for the Cornish constituency of Helston from 1807 to 1812, and for Aldeburgh in Suffolk from 1812 to 1818. He then sat in the House of Lords as a representative peer for Ireland from 1820 to 1836.

He was High Sheriff of Down for 1804 and  governor of County Down 1830–36. He served as aide-de-camp to King William IV.

In 1794, he raised the 33rd Light Dragoons (also known as Ulster Regiment of Light Dragoons). He was also colonel of the North Downshire Militia.

Marriage and death

On 15 November 1801, Blackwood married Anne Dorothea, the only daughter of John Foster, 1st Baron Oriel and his wife, Margaretta Foster, 1st Viscountess Ferrard. They had no children.

After a period of illness, Lord Dufferin died on 8 August 1836 at his home, Ballyleidy, age 81. He had been under treatment by Sir Henry Halford in London and then spent a week at the home of his brother-in-law, Thomas Skeffington, 2nd Viscount Ferrard, in County Louth. He died two days after returning home. He was succeeded in the titles by his younger brother Hans. Lady Blackwood died on 28 March 1865 aged 93.

Arms

References

External links 
 

1755 births
1836 deaths
Barons in the Peerage of Ireland
High Sheriffs of Down
Irish MPs 1783–1790
Irish MPs 1790–1797
Irish MPs 1798–1800
Members of the Parliament of Ireland (pre-1801) for County Down constituencies
Members of the Parliament of the United Kingdom for English constituencies
UK MPs 1807–1812
UK MPs 1812–1818
UK MPs who inherited peerages
Members of the Parliament of the United Kingdom for Helston
Irish representative peers
James
People from Killyleagh
Clandeboye